The 1999–00 Western Professional Hockey League season was the fourth season of the Western Professional Hockey League, a North American minor pro league. 18 teams participated in the regular season, and the Shreveport Mudbugs were the league champions.

Regular season

President's Cup-Playoffs

External links
 Season 1999/2000 on hockeydb.com

Western Professional Hockey League seasons
WPHL